Microsoma is a genus of flies in the family Tachinidae.

Species
M. exiguum (Meigen, 1824)
M. vicinum (Mesnil, 1970)

References

Diptera of Europe
Diptera of Asia
Dexiinae
Tachinidae genera
Taxa named by Pierre-Justin-Marie Macquart